Mohammad Ali Shojaei is a retired Iranian football player.

Club career
He played for Zob Ahan and Sepahan Isfahan in his career.

International career
He played for the Iran national football team and participated at the 1978 FIFA World Cup as a member of the squad.

References

Planet World Cup
RSSSF

1953 births
Living people
Iranian footballers
1978 FIFA World Cup players
Iran international footballers
Association football sweepers
Zob Ahan Esfahan F.C. players
Sepahan S.C. footballers